Katingan Regency is one of the thirteen regencies which comprise the Central Kalimantan Province on the island of Kalimantan (Borneo), Indonesia. The town of Kasongan is the capital of the Regency, which covers an area of 17,500 km2. The population of Katingan Regency was 146,439 at the 2010 Census and 162,222 at the 2020 Census; the official estimate as at mid 2021 was 163,099.

Administrative Districts 
Katingan Regency consists of thirteen districts (kecamatan), tabulated below with their areas and population totals from the 2010 Census and the 2020 Census, together with the official estimates as at mid 2021. They are grouped below for convenience into a southern sector and a northern sector (without any administrative significance). The table also includes the locations of the district administrative centres, the number of administrative villages (rural desa and urban kelurahan) in each district, and its postal codes.

Note: (a) including 9 small offshore or riverine islands. (b) including 10 small riverine islands.

References

Regencies of Central Kalimantan